Rózsa Péter, born Rózsa Politzer, (17 February 1905 – 16 February 1977) was a Hungarian mathematician and logician. She is best known as the "founding mother of recursion theory".

Early life and education
Péter was born in Budapest, Hungary, as Rózsa Politzer (Hungarian: Politzer Rózsa). She attended Pázmány Péter University (now Eötvös Loránd University), originally studying chemistry but later switching to mathematics. She attended lectures by Lipót Fejér and József Kürschák. While at university, she met László Kalmár; they would collaborate in future years and Kalmár encouraged her to pursue her love of mathematics.

After graduating in 1927, Péter could not find a permanent teaching position although she had passed her exams to qualify as a mathematics teacher. Due to the effects of the Great Depression, many university graduates could not find work and Péter began private tutoring. At this time, she also began her graduate studies.

Professional career and research
Initially, Péter began her graduate research on number theory. Upon discovering that her results had already been proven by the work of Robert Carmichael and L. E. Dickson, she abandoned mathematics to focus on poetry. However, she was convinced to return to mathematics by her friend László Kalmár, who suggested she research the work of Kurt Gödel on the theory of incompleteness. She prepared her own, different proofs to Gödel's work.

Péter presented the results of her paper on recursive theory, "", to the International Congress of Mathematicians in Zurich, Switzerland in 1932. In the summer of 1933, she worked with Paul Bernays in Göttingen, Germany, for the long chapter on recursive functions in the book  that appeared in 1934 under the names of David Hilbert and Bernays. Publication was under the name Politzer-Péter as she had changed her Jewish surname Politzer into Péter that same year. For her research, she received her PhD summa cum laude in 1935. In 1936, she presented a paper entitled "" to the International Congress of Mathematicians in Oslo. These papers helped to found the modern field of recursive function theory as a separate area of mathematical research.

In 1937, she was appointed as contributing editor of the Journal of Symbolic Logic.

After the passage of the Jewish Laws of 1939 in Hungary, Péter was forbidden to teach because of her Jewish origin and was briefly confined to a ghetto in Budapest. During World War II, she wrote her book Playing with Infinity: Mathematical Explorations and Excursions, a work for lay readers on the topics of number theory and logic. Originally published in Hungarian, it has been translated into English and at least a dozen other languages.

With the end of the war in 1945, Péter received her first full-time teaching appointment at the Budapest Teachers' Training College. In 1952, she was the first Hungarian woman to be made an Academic Doctor of Mathematics. After the College closed in 1955, she taught at Eötvös Loránd University until her retirement in 1975. She was a popular professor, known as "Aunt Rózsa" to her students.

In 1951, she published her key work , the first book on modern logic by a female author, later translated into English as Recursive Functions. She continued to publish important papers on recursive theory throughout her life. In 1959, she presented a major paper "" to the International Symposium in Warsaw (later published in two parts in 1961 and 1962).

Beginning in the mid-1950s, Péter applied recursive function theory to computers. Originally published in Hungarian, it was the second Hungarian mathematical book to be published in the Soviet Union because its subject matter was considered indispensable to the theory of computers. It was translated into English in 1981.

Honors
Péter was awarded the Kossuth Prize in 1951. She received the Manó Beke Prize by the János Bolyai Mathematical Society in 1953, the Silver State Prize in 1970, and the Gold State Prize in 1973. In 1973, she became the first woman to be elected to the Hungarian Academy of Sciences.

See also
 Ackermann function
 Recursive function theory
 List of pioneers in computer science

References

Members of the Hungarian Academy of Sciences
Hungarian Jews
20th-century Hungarian mathematicians
1905 births
1977 deaths
20th-century women scientists
Austro-Hungarian mathematicians
Jewish scientists
Eötvös Loránd University alumni
Academic staff of Eötvös Loránd University
Computability theorists
Theoretical computer scientists
Mathematicians from Budapest
Mathematical logicians
Women logicians
20th-century women mathematicians